C.H.Sekar is an Indian politician and was a member of the Fourteenth Tamil Nadu Legislative Assembly representing Gummidipundi Constituency from 2011.

Background 
Sekar was born in 1979. He is an entrepreneur and has various businesses. He holds a degree in mechanical engineering.

Political career 

He represented Gummidipoondi assembly constituency as a Vijayakant’s DMDK Party candidate in the 2011 TN Legislative Assembly. He left DMDK and joined the Dravida Munnetra Kazhagam and was appointed the Deputy Secretary of the Party’s IT Wing.

Electoral performance

Achievements 
At that time of elections, Sekar promised to get a bus depot to connect the rural areas, a sports stadium to promote sports among youth and to make Periyapalayam temple a tourist centre. Within two years, he obtained the approval from the Government for the same.

References 

1979 births
Living people
Indian politicians